Sophie and the Giants, also abbreviated as SATG, is an English music group founded in Sheffield in 2015.

History

Formation and early years (2015–2018) 
The group was founded by singer Sophie Scott: at first, the only goal of the band was just to practise music with the help of amateur musician friends, but in the spring of 2017 Scott decided to involve drummer Chris Hill, bassist Bailey Stapledon and guitarist Toby Holmes, who were three fellow students at the Guildford Music College at the time, to "take this more seriously and be like a proper band".

They later moved to Sheffield, where they started playing at gigs, mixing cover versions of Supertramp and Chris Isaak with original songs. April 2018 saw the release of their first single, Monsters, followed by the Adolescence EP in October, which included the songs Bulldog, Space Girl and Waste My Air.

Success (2019–present) 
SATG started 2019 by playing for BBC Radio Sheffield on 12 January; on 15 March, they released the new single The Light, which was chosen by Codemasters for the trailer of the then-forthcoming racing game Grid. The song was also used by Vodafone for advertising in Germany.

In early June, Antonia Pooles replaced Stapledon. Later that summer, the band played at the Reading and Leeds Festivals and at Glastonbury Festival. A new single, Break the Silence, was released in August, followed by Runaway in November, and in December SATG played again for BBC Radio Sheffield, this time live from Maida Vale Studios.

In early 2020, SATG worked with German DJ Purple Disco Machine on the song Hypnotized, which was released on 8 April, and the sound of which was heavily inspired by the italo disco music genre. Hypnotized was very successful across Europe, particularly in Italy, where it was awarded three platinum records; it was followed by the new single Right Now, released in February 2021.
Sophie and the Giants collaborated with Italian singer Michele Bravi on the song "Falene" with Sophie singing in Italian. The song was released on 18th June by Universal Music.

Members 
Current line-up
 Sophie Scott – vocals (2015–present)
 Antonia Pooles – bass guitar (2019–present)
 Toby Holmes – guitar (2017–present)
 Chris Hill – drums (2016–present)

Former members
 Bailey Stapledon – bass (2017–2019)

Discography

EP 

 Adolescence (2018)

Singles 
 "Monsters" (2018)
 "Bulldog" (2018)
 "Space Girl" (2018)
 "Waste My Air" (2018)
 "The Light" (2019)
 "Runaway" (2019)
 "Break the Silence" (2019)
 "Hypnotized" with Purple Disco Machine (2020)
 "Right Now" (2021)
 "Don't Ask Me to Change" (2021)
 "Golden Nights" (2021)
 "Falene" with Michele Bravi (2021)
 "In the Dark" with Purple Disco Machine (2022)
 "We Own The Night" (2022)

References 

Musical groups established in 2015
2015 establishments in England